Iringa Urban District is one of the five districts of the Iringa Region of Tanzania. It is bordered to the north, east, and west by the Iringa Rural District and to the south by the Kilolo District.  

According to the 2012 census, the population of the Iringa Urban District was 151,345.

Wards 

The Iringa Municipality is administratively divided into 18 wards:

References

Districts of Iringa Region